Renato is an album by Italian singer Mina, issued in 1962.

"Sabato notte" was the theme song for the TV show Studio Uno, while "Stringimi forte i polsi" was the theme song for the TV show Canzonissima.

"Eclisse twist" was the main theme song for Michelangelo Antonioni's film L'eclisse. Mina also recorded a French version of this song under the title of "Eclipse twist".

Mina covered the song "Renato" in French and in the original Spanish version, "Renata". She also recorded the original version of "Da chi" ("Y de ahí") and a Spanish version of "Chihuahua". All the songs were published, during the 1990s, in different unofficial compilations (Notre etoile, Mina latina due, Mina canta in spagnolo).

Track listing

Side A

Side B

1962 albums
Mina (Italian singer) albums
Italian-language albums